Vita Anda Tērauda (born 19 May 1962) is a Latvian politician elected to the 13th Saeima. Born in the United States, she worked as a radio journalist for Voice of America in Washington, D.C. from 1984 to 1988. Moving to Latvia after the reestablishment of independence in 1991, Tērauda served as Minister for National Reform in the cabinet of Prime Minister Māris Gailis from 1994 to 1995. She is a member of the Development/For! alliance and chairs the European Affairs Committee in the current Saeima.

In 1983, Tērauda received a bachelor's degree in international relations from American University. In 1990, she earned a master's degree in international economics and Soviet politics at Johns Hopkins University.

References

1962 births
Living people
Movement For! politicians
Government ministers of Latvia
21st-century Latvian women politicians
Deputies of the 13th Saeima
American women journalists
Women government ministers of Latvia
Women deputies of the Saeima
American University alumni
Paul H. Nitze School of Advanced International Studies alumni
21st-century American women